Inuwa Kashifu Abdullahi (born 21 February 1980) is a Nigerian technology expert, skilled technocrat and transformational leader that has left an indelible mark on the Nigerian IT ecosystem and sub-sector. He is a professional strategist and dynamic IT professional with key competencies that cut across growth management, policy formulation, solutions architecture, resource mobilization and strategy implementation. He is the current Director-General of the National Information Technology Development Agency (NITDA). 

He has amassed nearly two decades of corporate experience in the global private/public IT space and is the first Cisco Certified Internetwork Expert (CCIE) in Nigeria’s public sector. He currently holds a bachelor’s degree in computer science from ATBU Bauchi and is a recipient of multiple executive certifications from top-notch universities, including Harvard University, London Business School, Judge Business School, University of Cambridge, Oxford University, IMD Business School and Massachusetts Institute of Technology. His professional certifications include but are not limited to Innovation and entrepreneurship, transformational leadership, strategic transformation, service management, networking and solutions design.

Education 
Inuwa holds a Bachelor of Technology degree in Computer Science from Abubakar Tafawa Balewa University Bauchi State, Nigeria. He is also a recipient of multiple executive certifications in leadership, innovation, telecommunications, service management, networking and solutions design from top-notch universities, including Harvard University, University of Cambridge and Oxford University. Inuwa is an MIT-Sloan strategist trained at the prestigious Massachusetts Institute of Technology.

Career and Public Service 

Inuwa has almost two decades of experience in Information Technology operations, business transformation and solution architecture, across both private and public sectors. Prior to becoming Director-General of NITDA, Mr Inuwa worked at Galaxy Backbone Ltd as a senior network engineer before joining the Central Bank of Nigeria (CBN) as a senior technology solutions architect. In 2017, he joined NITDA as a Technical Assistant to the then Director-General before being appointed DG in 2019 by the President of the Federal Republic of Nigeria - Muhammadu Buhari, GCFR.

Director-General, National Information Technology Development Agency 

Mr Inuwa is the current DG/CEO of NITDA - the apex Information Technology Regulatory Agency for the Nigerian ICT ecosystem. In this position, he has implemented several strategic initiatives and projects designed to foster digital inclusion, accelerate innovation, create jobs and improve access to critical IT infrastructure across the country.  In Q2 of 2021, it is worthy to note that the ICT sector under his watch contributed 17.92%  to the National GDP and led to Nigeria’s exit from recession. Mr Inuwa is also credited  with saving over 35 Billion Naira (84 million USD) of government funds since 2019 through the design and implementation of the IT clearance initiative across federal parastatals, amongst other achievements. 

Key Achievements

 The design, development and implementation of the “Systemic Reform and Development of NITDA” (SRAP- 2021 to 2024)
 Design & Implementation of NITDA Strategic Roadmap & Action Plan (2021 -2024).
 Transforming Nigeria into a Digital Economy through Developmental Regulation
 Capacity building and Human Resource Development
 Design & Implementation of IT Clearance for government MDAs
 Development of Nigeria Data Protection Regulation (NDPR) Implementation Framework
 Successful Launch of National Public Key Infrastructure (PKI)
 Completion of ISO 27001:2013 Certification for NITDA
 Promoting Nigerian Content in IT through Improved ICT Goods and Services 
 Bridging the Digital Divide through IT Infrastructure Deployment
 Certification of Data protection Companies

T.A to the DG NITDA 

Between 2017 and 2019, Mr. Inuwa worked as the Technical Assistant to then Director-General- Isa Pantami. Inuwa was actively engaged in the design, planning, coordination and execution of NITDA’s strategic goals across various thematic areas including IT Regulation, Capacity Building, Local Content Development, Government Digital Services, Digital Job Creation, Digital Inclusion and Cyber Security. He was responsible for overseeing NITDA’s procurement process and achieved a 7% reduction in the cost of major projects every year. He also managed the execution of over 300 IT interventions across Nigeria and coordinated local content adoption initiatives to encourage the use of indigenous content and solutions

Technology Architect at the Central Bank of Nigeria 
Inuwa created the technology architecture repository that highlighted a 360-degree view of the Central Bank of Nigeria IT infrastructure in real-time.  Consequently, this allowed for easier decision making on IT infrastructure and asset investment. Working with relevant departments, he executed a software license rationalization that saved the bank over 5m USD in annual license fees & subscriptions. As a Senior Technology Architect in the Central Bank of Nigeria, he designed, planned and coordinated numerous initiatives that helped in achieving a cashless society in Nigeria.

Senior Solutions Architect at Galaxy Backbone Nigeria 
Mr Inuwa spent 9 years at Galaxy backbone Limited and grew through the ranks. As a Senior Solutions Architect, he was responsible for the deployment, administration and management of key technology infrastructure for the company. His verifiable accomplishments at Galaxy Backbone remain relevant to date. He was responsible for:

 The design of over 10 National IT systems that helped in promoting e-government deployment in Nigeria
 Orchestrating solution architecture templates that reduced the mean-time to develop enterprise solution architectures from 15 to 10 days
 The design of the National IP/MPLS backbone that successfully connected 500+ locations and integrated 150+ agencies in Nigeria.

Contributions to Information and Technology Development in Nigeria 
Mr Inuwa is a dynamic IT professional and innovation strategist with key competencies that cut across Solutions Architecture, Resource Mobilization and Strategy Implementation. He has amassed nearly 2 decades of corporate experience in the global private/public IT space and is also the first Cisco Certified Internetwork Expert (CCIE) in Nigeria’s public sector. Since his appointment as the DG of NITDA, he has upskilled and reskilled over 1.5 million Nigerians from different walks of life, and is  credited with the formulation of critical policy frameworks that guides the Nigerian government’s activities and interventions in the IT ecosystem. In 2019, he oversaw the issuance of endorsement certificates for over 1,000 Indigenous IT companies and service providers.  He also approved the issuance of licenses to 12 local OEMs and 100+ data protection companies. He is also a strong advocate safe cyber spaces and championed multiple programs, policies and solutions for cyber safety in Nigeria. He was part of the team that developed the Central Bank of Nigeria (CBN) Technology Architecture Repository (TAR). He initiated, designed and executed a software license rationalization programme that helped save the Federal Government $5 million on annual licensing & subscriptions for Nigeria’s apex bank.

Awards and recognition 
Inuwa is the recipient of multiple awards and recognition for his achievements in governance, technology and leadership. He remains a role model to several young Nigerians. See an overview of some of his most prestigious awards. 

 ISACA Global Inspirational Leadership Award – By ISACA International Professional Association
 100 Leading Telecom and ICT Personalities in Nigeria - By Association of Telecommunications Companies of Nigeria (ATCON)
 Pillar of Digital Entrepreneurship Award By Eminent Emerging Entrepreneurs Foundation
 2020 Most Impactful Director-General – By National Information Reporters Association (NITRA)
 2020 Special Award for driving ICT development in Nigeria - By Abuja Enterprise Agency (AEA).
 2019 Achievement Award for regulating Data Protection in Nigeria by Data & Knowledge Information Privacy Protection Initiative
 2019 Icon of Societal Transformation Award by Northern Women Assembly (NOWA)
 2019 Award of Excellence by the Vice-Chancellor NILE University, Prof. Osman Nuri Aras

Twitter Suspension 
During Nigeria’s Twitter suspension, Mr Inuwa led the technical team that had a robust engagement that spurred global digital diplomacy and set a new template for the operations of big tech companies in Nigeria and other developing countries.

Membership & Affiliation 
Mr Inuwa is a thoroughbred IT professional and solutions architect who is affiliated with notable associations and societies across the globe. He equally holds many professional certifications in telecommunications, service management, networking and solution design. See an overview of his memberships and affiliations below:

 British Computer Society (BCS)
 Nigerian Computer Society (NCS – 05452)
 IT Service Management (ITSM)
 ISACA
 Project Management Institute (PMI)

References

1980 births
Living people
Nigerian Muslims
Abubakar Tafawa Balewa University alumni
People from Jigawa State